Shelgaon (K) is a village in the Karmala taluka of Solapur district in Maharashtra state, India.

Demographics
Covering  and comprising 335 households at the time of the 2011 census of India, Shelgaon (K) had a population of 1473. There were 760 males and 713 females, with 170 people being aged six or younger.

References

Villages in Karmala taluka